Peder Planting (born 6 June 1952) is a Finnish fencer. He competed in the individual and team épée events at the 1980 Summer Olympics.

References

External links
 

1952 births
Living people
Finnish male épée fencers
Olympic fencers of Finland
Fencers at the 1980 Summer Olympics
Sportspeople from Helsinki